Nogometni Klub Inter Zaprešić (English: Football Club Inter Zaprešić) is a Croatian football club based in Zaprešić, a town northwest of the capital Zagreb founded in 1929.

They play in the Prva HNL after they were promoted from the Druga HNL at the end of the 2013–14 season.

Competitions

1.HNL

References

External links

Inter Zaprešić profile at UEFA.com
Inter Zaprešić profile at Nogometni magazin 

NK Inter Zaprešić
Inter Zapresic